The 2017 Tre Valli Varesine was the 97th edition of the Tre Valli Varesine road cycling one day race. It was held on 3 October 2017 as part of the 2017 UCI Europe Tour in category 1.HC, over a distance of 192.9 km, starting in Saronno and ending in Varese.

Teams
Twenty-four teams were invited to take part in the race. These included thirteen UCI WorldTeams, seven UCI Professional Continental teams and four UCI Continental teams.

Results

References 

Tre Valli Varesine
Tre Valli Varesine
Tre Valli Varesine